Žarko Marković may refer to:

 Žarko Marković (footballer) (born 1987), Serbian footballer
 Žarko Marković (handballer) (born 1986), Montenegrin-Qatari handball player